La Vida color de rosa is a 1951 Argentine comedy film directed by León Klimovsky written by Carlos A. Petit.The film starred Virginia Luque and José María Gutiérrez.

Cast
In alphabetical order:
 Santiago Arrieta
 Magali Drexel
 Renée Dumas
 José María Gutiérrez
 Nelly Lainez
 Adolfo Linvel
 Virginia Luque
 Bertha Moss
 Fidel Pintos
 Ángel Prio
 Aída Villadeamigo

External links
 

1951 films
1951 comedy films
1950s Spanish-language films
Films directed by León Klimovsky
Argentine comedy films
Argentine black-and-white films
1950s Argentine films